The  is a street in Hanover, Germany. The street is known for prostitution and strip clubs.

History
The name of the street derives from the riding facilities it contained and the proximity to the city wall. On an 1834 map it is shown as the "riding by Hanover's walls of fortification" and ran from Steintor towards the Leine, a tributary of the river Aller. There was a riding school, a riding arena and stables, which belonged to the court stables of the Leineschloss. Around the middle of the 19th century, the street was renamed  (later renamed ), and the name  given to the side street that currently bears the name.

The address  was the location of the printing and publishing house called , which published, amongst others, the 1846 court and state handbook for the Kingdom of Hanover.

Modern times
The road was declared a "dangerous place" for the purposes of Lower Saxon law on public order and safety.

The entertainment area of the red light district with brothels, strip clubs, clubs, bars and tattoo shops was under the control of the Hells Angels for many years. The "King" of the area was Frank Hanebuth up until 2011. Hanebuth was the leader of the Bones outlaw motorcycle club, which in 1999 amalgamated with the Hells Angels. In 2010, the Hells Angels met with rivals, the Bandidos, in the restaurant Little Italy and under lawyer Götz von Fromberg agreed a "peace treaty". The Hanover Hells Angels were dissolved in 2012 and the following year the Black Jackets attempted to control the district.

 has declined as a red-light district in recent years.  and also im 2019 the laufhaus Sexworld was closed and converted into 20 apartments.

See also

 Prostitution in Germany

References

Hanover
Streets in Germany
Red-light districts in Germany